Norbert Hummelt (born 30 December 1962 in Neuss) is a German poet, essayist and translator.

Hummelt studied German studies and English studies in Cologne until 1990. He worked together with Marcel Beyer and like him he started as a rather experimental writer, following Rolf Dieter Brinkmann and Thomas Kling. From 1988 to 1992 he was head of the Kölner Autorenwerkstatt; an authors group in Cologne. With his second collection of poems, „singtrieb“ from 1997, he came closer to concepts of Romantic poetry.

Norbert Hummelt lived in the Bergisches Land near Cologne for several years. Since January 2006 he lives in Berlin. He taught and gave classes in creative writing at the Deutsches Literaturinstitut Leipzig and works for the Text+Kritik journal.

Collections of poems 

 knackige codes (crisp codes), Galrev 1993
 singtrieb (appetite for singing / sing instinct), Urs Engeler Editor 1997
 Zeichen im Schnee (signs in the snow), Luchterhand 2001
 Bildstock (picture stock), Kunstverein Hasselbach 2003
 Stille Quellen (silent fonts), Luchterhand 2004
 Totentanz (dance of the dead), Luchterhand 2007

Translations 

 Inger Christensen, Das Schmetterlingstal. Ein Requiem (from Danish, in: Schreibheft, no. 52, 1999)
 Four Quartets, T. S. Eliot (in: T. S. Eliot: Four Quartets ..., Rigodon, 2006).
 T. S. Eliot, Das öde Land, Suhrkamp : Frankfurt am Main 2008

Selected essays 

 out here in the dark, essay, in:  38, 2005.
 Du hast dich durch Räume bewegt (you moved through spaces), about Lars Reyer's poems, in: , no. 17, special edition for German contemporary poetry, Hildesheim 2007

Editor 

 William Butler Yeats – Die Gedichte (Luchterhand Literaturverlag 2005)
 Lyrikedition 2000 (since 2005)

Selected awards 
 Förderpreis Literatur des Landes Nordrhein-Westfalen 1995 
 Rolf-Dieter-Brinkmann-Stipendium of the city of Cologne 1996 
  1998
 Hermann-Lenz-Stipendium 2000
 Fellow der Raketenstation Hombroich 2005
 Niederrheinischer Literaturpreis 2007

References

External links 
Hummelt at Lyrikwelt, German
About Hummelts poetry, German
Author page at Lyrikline.org, with audio, text, and translations).

1962 births
Living people
People from Neuss
Writers from North Rhine-Westphalia
German poets
German male poets
German-language poets